Strong is a city in Union County, Arkansas, United States. The population was 558 at the 2010 census.

Geography
Strong is located in the southern part of Arkansas. (33.109856, -92.358353).

Demographics

As of the census of 2000, there were 651 people, 256 households, and 171 families residing in the city. The racial makeup of the city was 42.24% White, 53.61% Black or African American, 0.15% Native American, 0.15% Asian, 3.07% from other races, and 0.77% from two or more races.  5.68% of the population were Hispanic or Latino of any race.

There were 256 households, out of which 29.3% had children under the age of 18 living with them, 37.5% were married couples living together, 23.8% had a female householder with no husband present, and 33.2% were non-families. 30.5% of all households were made up of individuals, and 14.1% had someone living alone who was 65 years of age or older.  The average household size was 2.54 and the average family size was 3.19.

In the city, the population was spread out, with 29.8% under the age of 18, 10.0% from 18 to 24, 22.6% from 25 to 44, 20.3% from 45 to 64, and 17.4% who were 65 years of age or older.  The median age was 36 years. For every 100 females, there were 77.9 males.  For every 100 females age 18 and over, there were 75.1 males. The median income for a household in the city was $21,389, and the median income for a family was $26,023. Males had a median income of $25,750 versus $20,417 for females. The per capita income for the city was $10,802.  About 24.3% of families and 32.3% of the population were below the poverty line, including 47.5% of those under age 18 and 22.6% of those age 65 or over.

Education 
Strong is the home of the Strong–Huttig School District, which includes Gardner–Strong Elementary School and Strong High School.

On July 1, 2004, the Strong School District consolidated with the Huttig School District to form the Strong-Huttig School District.

References

Cities in Union County, Arkansas
Cities in Arkansas